Kirkintilloch High School is a six-year co-educational secondary school located in the Oxgang area of Kirkintilloch, East Dunbartonshire, Scotland.

School roll
There are around 600 pupils with an annual first year of five classes of up to thirty pupils each, all coming from six associated primary schools: Gartconner; Harestanes; Hillhead; Oxgang, Twechar and Craighead.

Building
As part of the Scottish Government's £134m PPP school's capital investment program, a new building opened to the pupils on 19 August 2009, replacing the thirty-six-year-old building on the same site. It was originally slated to open April 2009 but a 2008 fire delayed completion until August 2009.

Alumni

 Andrew Crumey, novelist
 Gregg Wylde, Plymouth Argyle player.
 James Scott, Hull City player.

References

External links
Kirkintilloch School Website
Kirkintilloch's page on Scottish Schools Online

Secondary schools in East Dunbartonshire
School buildings completed in 2009
Educational institutions established in 1973
Kirkintilloch
1973 establishments in Scotland